Nicholas Bartlett Doe (June 16, 1786 – December 6, 1856) was a U.S. Representative from New York.

Biography
Born in New York City, Doe graduated from Phillips Exeter Academy, in Exeter, New Hampshire. He studied law, was admitted to the bar, and settled in Saratoga County, New York to work as a lawyer. He was a member of the New York State Assembly (Saratoga Co.) in 1825.

Doe was elected as a Whig to the Twenty-sixth Congress to fill the vacancy caused by the death of Anson Brown. He took his seat on December 7, 1840, and served until March 3, 1841. After his term as representative, he resumed practicing law, and became trustee of the village of Waterford, Saratoga County, in 1841.

Doe died at Saratoga Springs, New York, December 6, 1856. He was interred in Greenridge Cemetery.

References

1786 births
1856 deaths
Phillips Exeter Academy alumni
Members of the New York State Assembly
Burials at Greenridge Cemetery
Whig Party members of the United States House of Representatives from New York (state)
19th-century American politicians